The Estrella Warbirds Museum is an aviation museum dedicated to the restoration and preservation of military aircraft, vehicles, and memorabilia. The museum is located at Paso Robles Municipal Airport in central California and is named after Estrella Army Airfield. In July, 2009, the museum opened an automobile display featuring classic racing cars, The Woodland Auto Display.

History
The museum began in 1993, when it acquired and moved three buildings from a former almond orchard to the airport. Originally founded as the Estrella Squadron of the Commemorative Air Force, it became independent in 2000.

A collection of military vehicles was donated by Herman Pfauter and in 2015 it was placed on display in a new  building called the Red Ball Express Motor Pool.

Facilities
The museum is made up of the Hangar One, Al Schade Restoration Hangar, Thompson Hall, Freedom Hall, Brooks Building, Woodland Auto Display, Hind Pavilion, and Pfauter Building.

Exhibits
Exhibits at the museum include a radio room and an flight simulator.

Collection

Aircraft

 Aermacchi MB-326
 Aeronca L-16
 Beechcraft T-34 Mentor
 Beechcraft T-34 Mentor
 Bell UH-1D Iroquois
 Cessna T-37B Tweet
 Douglas A-4A Skyhawk
 Douglas C-47B Skytrain
 Douglas ERA-3B Skywarrior – cockpit
 Douglas TA-4J Skyhawk
 Focke-Wulf FWP.149D
 Fouga CM.170 Magister
 General Atomics Gnat-750
 General Dynamics F-16B Fighting Falcon
 Grumman A-6E Intruder
 Grumman F-14B Tomcat
 Grumman F9F-8P Cougar
 Grumman US-2D Tracker
 Gyrodyne QH-50D DASH
 LTV NA-7C Corsair II
 Lockheed P2V-5F Neptune
 Lockheed T-33A Shooting Star
 Lockheed TF-104G Starfighter
 McDonnell Douglas F-4S Phantom II
 McDonnell Douglas F-4S Phantom II – cockpit
 North American QF-86F Sabre
 North American T-28B Trojan
 North American SNJ-5C Texan
 North American Rockwell OV-10A Bronco
 Northrop AQM-38
 Northrop F-5E Tiger II
 Radioplane MQM-33
 Ryan BQM-34S Firebee
 Saab A 32A Lansen
 Saab J 35 Draken
 Sikorsky UH-19D Chickasaw
 Sikorsky UH-34D Choctaw
 Stinson L-5E Sentinel
 Stinson Reliant I
 Taylor J-2
 UTVA Aero 3
 Vought F-8K Crusader

Armament and ordnance
As of January 2019, the following armament and ordnance were on exhibit at the museum.

Bofors 40mm anti-aircraft gun
M40 105 mm Recoilless Rifle
General Dynamics M60A3 main battle tank
Quad 50 cal M2 Heavy Barrel Machine Gun
United Defense M901 ITV anti-tank vehicle
57mm M1 anti-tank gun
ZPU-1 14.5 mm anti-aircraft gun

Military vehicles
As of December 2019, the following military vehicles were on exhibit at the museum.

AMC Mighty Mite Jeep
Diamond REO M52
Dodge M37 WC Truck
Dodge M43 Ambulance
Dodge WC4 Power Wagon
Excelsior Welbike Mark 1
FMC Landing Vehicle Tracked LVPT-5
FMC Armored Personnel Carrier M113A3
Ford GPW Jeep
Ford GTBA G622 Burma Jeep
Ford Model T Ambulance
Ford MUTT Jeep
General Motors DUKW 1942 Utility Vehicle AWD
Higgins LCVP Landing Craft
IHC M35 Series Troop Carrier
M35A1 Armored Gun Truck
M60A3 Tank
Alvis Saracen FV-603 armored personnel carrier
White M2 Half Track
Willys M274 Mule with 105 mm Recoilless Rifle
Willys M38A1 Jeep

Missiles
As of January 2019, the following missiles were on exhibit at the museum.

Hughes AIM-4 Falcon air-to-air missile
Martin HGM-25A Titan I intercontinental ballistic missile
Raytheon AIM-7 Sparrow air-to-air missile
Raytheon AIM-9 Sidewinder air-to-air missile
Raytheon AIM-54C Phoenix air-to-air missile
Raytheon AIM-120 AMRAAM air-to-air missile

Other exhibits
Link Trainer

Events
The museum holds an fundraiser event every year called Warbirds, Wings and Wheels.

Gallery

See also
List of aerospace museums

Footnotes

External links

 

Museums in San Luis Obispo County, California
Buildings and structures in Paso Robles, California
Aerospace museums in California
Automobile museums in California
Military and war museums in California
Museums established in 1992
1992 establishments in California